Viscount Aboyne was a title in the Peerage of Scotland. It was created on 20 April 1632 for George Gordon, Earl of Enzie, eldest son of George Gordon, 1st Marquess of Huntly, with remainder that the title should pass to his second son the Hon. James Gordon on his death or on the death of his father, whichever came first. On Lord Huntly's succession to the marquessate in 1636 the viscountcy passed according to the special remainder to his second son, the second Viscount. He never married and on his death in 1649 the title became extinct.

Viscounts Aboyne (1632)
George Gordon, 2nd Marquess of Huntly, 1st Viscount Aboyne (d. 1649)
James Gordon, 2nd Viscount Aboyne (d. 1649)

See also
Aboyne Castle
Earl of Aboyne

Notes

References

Extinct viscountcies in the Peerage of Scotland
Noble titles created in 1632
Peerages created with special remainders
Peerages created for eldest sons of peers